Hippocephala argentistriata is a species of beetle in the family Cerambycidae. It was described by Holzschuh in 2006.

References

Agapanthiini
Beetles described in 2006
Taxa named by Carolus Holzschuh